The canton of Tournus is an administrative division of the Saône-et-Loire department, eastern France. Its borders were modified at the French canton reorganisation which came into effect in March 2015. Its seat is in Tournus.

It consists of the following communes:
 
Beaumont-sur-Grosne
Boyer
Bresse-sur-Grosne
Champagny-sous-Uxelles
La Chapelle-de-Bragny
La Chapelle-sous-Brancion
Chardonnay
Étrigny
Farges-lès-Mâcon
Gigny-sur-Saône
Grevilly
Jugy
Lacrost
Laives
Lalheue
Mancey
Martailly-lès-Brancion
Montceaux-Ragny
Nanton
Ozenay
Plottes
Préty
Royer
Saint-Ambreuil
Saint-Cyr
Sennecey-le-Grand
Tournus
La Truchère
Uchizy
Vers
Le Villars

References

Cantons of Saône-et-Loire